Wohltorf is a municipality in the district of Lauenburg, in Schleswig-Holstein, Germany.

Transportation
Wohltorf station is serviced by the rapid transit system of the Hamburg S-Bahn.

References

Municipalities in Schleswig-Holstein
Herzogtum Lauenburg